Pediodectes is a genus of shield-backed katydids in the family Tettigoniidae. There are about nine described species in Pediodectes.

Species
These species belong to the genus Pediodectes:
 Pediodectes bruneri (Caudell, 1907) (bruner shieldback)
 Pediodectes daedelus (Rehn & Hebard, 1920) (daedalus shieldback)
 Pediodectes grandis (Rehn, 1904) (grand shieldback)
 Pediodectes haldemanii (Girard, 1854) (haldeman's shieldback)
 Pediodectes mitchelli (Caudell, 1911)
 Pediodectes nigromarginatus (Caudell, 1902) (black-margined shieldback)
 Pediodectes pratti (Caudell, 1911)
 Pediodectes stevensonii (Thomas, 1870) (Stevenson's shieldback)
 Pediodectes tinkhami Hebard, 1934 (Tinkham's shieldback)

References

Further reading

External links

 

Tettigoniinae